The 2017 Pan American Men's Junior Handball Championship the XII edition of this tournament took place in Asunción, Paraguay from 20 to 25 March 2017. It acts as a qualifying tournament for the 2017 Men's Junior World Handball Championship.

Participating teams

Preliminary round

All times are local (UTC−03:00).

Group A

Group B

Knockout stage

Bracket

Quarterfinals

Semifinals

Consolation round

Third place game

Final

Final standing

References

External links
Championship page on PATHF Official Website

Pan American Men's Junior Handball Championship
Pan American Men's Junior Handball Championship
International sports competitions hosted by Paraguay
2017 in Paraguayan sport
March 2017 sports events in South America